The Cayman Islands requires its residents to register their motor vehicles and display vehicle registration plates. Vehicles plates usually have six numbers on them, separated into groups of three.  Most plates have 'Cayman Islands' written beneath the numbers and are North American standard 6 × 12 inches (152 × 300 mm).

In 2003, quincentennial plates (known as Q-plates) were issued; they had four blue numbers following a 'Q' on a background depicting a picturesque Cayman scene with celebratory logos.  Initially, Q-plates were issued with white characters but these were recalled and replaced.

See also 
Vehicle registration plates of British overseas territories

References

Cayman Islands
Road transport in the Cayman Islands
Cayman Islands-related lists